Raymond Mnyamezeli Mlungisi "Ray" Zondo (born 4 May 1960) is a South African judge who is currently serving as Chief Justice of South Africa since 2022. President Cyril Ramaphosa appointed Zondo as South Africa's new chief justice with effect from 1 April 2022. He served as acting Chief Justice from 11 October 2021, when Mogoeng Mogoeng retired, until 31 March 2022.

Early life
Zondo was educated at St Mary's Seminary in Ixopo, the University of Zululand and the University of Natal, where he completed his LLB. He was admitted as an attorney in 1989 and practised as a partner in Mathe & Zondo Inc. Judge Zondo received a Master of Laws in commercial law, a Master of Laws in labour law, and a Master of Laws in patent law at the University of South Africa.

Judicial career
In 1997 he was appointed a judge of the Labour Court, and in 1999 he was appointed to the Transvaal Provincial Division of the High Court (later the North Gauteng High Court, now the Gauteng Division). In 2000 he was elevated to Judge President of the Labour Court, a post in which he served for ten years. In 2010 he returned to the Pretoria High Court.

From November 2011 to May 2012, Zondo served as an acting judge of the Constitutional Court. He was permanently appointed with effect from September 2012 and is now considered a key member, with Chris Jafta, of the Court's conservative wing. In June 2017, President Jacob Zuma appointed Zondo to the office of Deputy Chief Justice, succeeding Dikgang Moseneke who retired in 2016. On 10 March 2022, President Cyril Ramaphosa appointed Zondo as the new Chief Justice of the Constitutional Court of South Africa, effective 1 April.

Commission of Inquiry into State Capture
Shortly after taking office in 2018, Ramaphosa approved an inquiry into allegations of corruption during the previous Jacob Zuma government administration, stating that "This is the year in which we will turn the tide of corruption in our public institutions". Zondo was appointed as presiding judge for the Judicial Commission of Inquiry into Allegations of State Capture, Corruption and Fraud in the Public Sector including Organs of State, leading to its popular name, the Zondo Commission. Hearings began on 20 August 2018 and were expected to last for two years.

References

1960 births
Living people
20th-century South African judges
20th-century South African lawyers
21st-century South African judges
Chief justices of South Africa
Judges of the Constitutional Court of South Africa
People from KwaZulu-Natal
University of Natal alumni
University of Zululand alumni
Zulu people